Reservoir is the debut studio album by Australian musician Gordi, released on 25 August 2017 via Jagjaguwar.

At the 2017 J Awards, the album was nominated for Australian Album of the Year.

Track listing

Charts

References

2017 debut albums
Gordi (musician) albums
Jagjaguwar albums